Underneath is the fourth studio album by American hardcore punk band Code Orange, released on March 13, 2020 through Roadrunner Records. It is their first album to be produced by Nick Raskulinecz. The album was also produced by Jami Morgan and Will Yip. It was preceded by three singles: "Underneath", "Swallowing the Rabbit Whole", and "Sulfur Surrounding". The album continues the band's metalcore and hardcore punk sound with a heavier emphasis on industrial and electronic elements. The album received critical acclaim with critics praising the use of glitches and electronics and the overall production in general.

Background and recording
Frontman Jami Morgan said that the album "was a 24-hour-a-day obsession for us for about two years". This led Code Orange to cancel a European tour cycle in 2019, including an appearance at England's Bloodstock Open Air, in order to focus solely on writing and recording. The band reached out to prolific producer and musician Chris Vrenna through the album's producer Nick Raskulinecz, who helped Eric Balderose in the electronics, the arrangement of the many layers of production and the use of white noise. The album was also produced by Jami Morgan and co-produced by Will Yip. Yip also helped produce the band's previous album. Reba Meyers had to readapt her guitar work to imitate electronic instruments, and she also recorded many unusual sounds which they mixed with samples, making a "bank of" them used in different songs. Morgan further commented that writing Underneath "was like a factory… everyone [was] working towards this goal."

While making the album, Morgan regularly talked to and sent material of Underneath to his friend Greg Puciato of the Dillinger Escape Plan and the Black Queen, who gave him feedback on it. The singer was one of the first people to hear the record, and Morgan called him a "mentor".

Composition
Musically, Underneath has been described as metalcore, hardcore punk, industrial, industrial metal, alternative rock, alternative metal, grunge, nu metal, industrial hardcore, metallic hardcore, screamo, thrash metal, sludge metal, math rock, and classic rock. The album utilizes pauses, glitches, distorted screams, and static.

Release
On December 19, 2019, Code Orange launched whatisreallyunderneath.com, a website that presented visitors with an interactive panoramic photo. The band released music videos directed by Max Moore for the title song "Underneath" on January 10, 2020 and for the song "Swallowing the Rabbit Whole" on February 7, 2020. The third single, "Sulfur Surrounding", with a video animated and directed by the band's Eric Balderose, was released on March 9. The album was released on March 13, 2020. On March 14, 2020, Code Orange performed a live streamed album release concert in an empty venue on Twitch due to the COVID-19 pandemic. The performance took place at the Roxian Theatre and was called "Last Ones Left: In Fear of the End". The performance was later officially released on YouTube.

On June 7, they performed "Underneath" at NXT TakeOver: In Your House as it was the official theme song. On January 23, 2021, an animated motion-capture video for the song "Autumn and Carbine" was premiered on Adult Swim's Toonami. The video was directed by Eric Balderose and Jami Morgan and utilized motion-capture to create 3D models of the band members themselves.

Critical reception

Underneath was met with critical acclaim. At Metacritic, which assigns a normalized rating out of 100 to reviews from mainstream publications, the album received an average score of 84, which indicates "universal acclaim", based on 11 reviews. The record also received an average score of 8.0 from AnyDecentMusic?, normalized rating out of 9.

Clash critic John Gray described the record as "practically a horror movie in audio form", stating that the "sheer, clear-eyed ambition they exhibit in pursuing the impossible is compelling enough to make Underneath an absolute must-hear for anyone who dares to dream differently." Consequence of Sounds Joseph Schafer thought that the record "delivers on every promise in a sleek, incredibly catchy package and does it all in under 50 minutes." Reviewing for Exclaim!, Connor Atkinson noted: "Code Orange usher in a new era with Underneath that will alienate sections of their audience, and bring their us-against-you might to places no Pittsburgh band have gone before." Ben Beaumont-Thomas of The Guardian wrote: "In rock, technical brilliance can sometimes impede immediacy, but Code Orange use it to achieve total and thrilling omnipotence. They are a reminder that visionary music never wears a genre tag."

The Independents Roisin O'Connor described the album as "a glitchy, industrial wasteland". Nick Ruskell of Kerrang! called the album "one of the most powerful, cathartic, creatively satisfying and bruisingly heavy records of its age."

The album received a rare perfect score from Metal Hammer. In the review Stephen Hill stated, "It's not always easy to define a 'perfect' record, but you have to ask yourself what you want from a heavy band in 2020. Innovation? Ambition? Power? Something anthemic? Something that stops heavy music from chasing its tail and genuinely moves it forward?" Axl Rosenberg of MetalSucks called Underneath "the band's most satisfying release to date". Dannii Leivers of NME was positive about the album "You never know quite what's about to happen, but no matter which sonic mask the band slip on, they sound terrifyingly comfortable wearing it. This unpredictability is what makes Code Orange and Underneath' such a thrilling listen."

Grayson Haver Currin of Pitchfork was less positive and called Underneath "an overstuffed album of weak modern-rock imitations."

Accolades

 Track listing 

 Personnel 
Credits for Underneath''Code Orange Eric Balderose – vocals, keyboards, programming, mixing
 Reba Meyers – vocals, guitars, engineering
 Jami Morgan – vocals, drums, producer
 Joe Goldman – bass
 Dominic Landolina – vocals, guitarsAdditional musicians Nicole Dollanganger – additional vocals on "(deeperthanbefore)", "Swallowing The Rabbit Hole", "Cold.Metal.Place"
 Chris Vrenna – additional programmingProduction Nick Raskulinecz – producer
 Will Yip – co-producer, mixing, engineering
 Andrew Dawson – mixing on "Underneath"
 Vince Ratti – co-mixing
 Nathan Yarborough – engineering
 Vlado Meller – mastering
 Dave Rath – A&RVisual art'''
 Setta Studio – visual producer, visual effects, additional enhancement
 Autumn Morgan – art concept
 Elizabeth Farrington – assist
 Mandy Simpson – assist
 Jason Baker – props and makeup
 Virgilio Tzaj – layout
 Tim Saccenti – photographer
 Joe Gerardi – retouching

Charts

References

External links 
 whatisreallyunderneath.com

2020 albums
Roadrunner Records albums
Code Orange (band) albums
Albums produced by Will Yip